Robinson Odoch Opong (born 10 May 1989) is a Ugandan professional basketball player who last played for Rivers Hoopers of the Nigerian Premier League (NPL) and the Basketball Africa League (BAL). He also plays for the Uganda national basketball team.

Career
On 11 April 2020, Opong signed with the Saskatchewan Rattlers of the Canadian CEBL.

In April 2021, Opong signed with Rivers Hoopers to play in the 2021 BAL season. He replaced the injured Festus Ezeli.

He represented Uganda at AfroBasket 2017, leading his team in minutes, points, and steals.

BAL career statistics

|-
| style="text-align:left;"|2021
| style="text-align:left;"|Rivers Hoopers
| 3 || 1 || 17.4 || .158 || .083 || – || 3.3 || 1.0 || .0 || .3 || 2.3
|-
|- class="sortbottom"
| style="text-align:center;" colspan="2"|Career
| 3 || 1 || 17.4 || .158 || .083 || – || 3.3 || 1.0 || .0 || .3 || 2.3

References

External links
 FIBA profile
 RealGM profile
 Afrobasket.com profile

1989 births
Living people
City Oilers players
Forwards (basketball)
Guards (basketball)
Halifax Hurricanes players
Rivers Hoopers players
Rogers State Hillcats men's basketball players
Saskatchewan Rattlers players
Ugandan expatriate sportspeople in Canada
Ugandan expatriate sportspeople in Nigeria
Ugandan expatriate sportspeople in Spain
Ugandan men's basketball players
Ugandan people of Canadian descent
Clube Ferroviário da Beira basketball players